A computer-assisted proof is a mathematical proof that has been at least partially generated by computer.

Most computer-aided proofs to date have been implementations of large proofs-by-exhaustion of a mathematical theorem. The idea is to use a computer program to perform lengthy computations, and to provide a proof that the result of these computations implies the given theorem.  In 1976, the four color theorem was the first major theorem to be verified using a computer program.

Attempts have also been made in the area of artificial intelligence research to create smaller, explicit, new proofs of mathematical theorems from the bottom up using automated reasoning techniques such as heuristic search. Such automated theorem provers have proved a number of new results and found new proofs for known theorems.  Additionally, interactive proof assistants allow mathematicians to develop human-readable proofs which are nonetheless formally verified for correctness.  Since these proofs are generally human-surveyable (albeit with difficulty, as with the proof of the Robbins conjecture) they do not share the controversial implications of computer-aided proofs-by-exhaustion.

Methods 
One method for using computers in mathematical proofs is by means of so-called validated numerics or rigorous numerics. This means computing numerically yet with mathematical rigour. This is done by controlling, enclosing and propagating round-off and truncation errors using for example interval arithmetic. More precisely, one reduces the computation to a sequence of elementary operations, say . In a computer, the result of each elementary operation is rounded off by the computer precision. However, one can construct an interval provided by upper and lower bounds on the result of an elementary operation. Then one proceeds by replacing numbers with intervals and  performing  elementary operations between such intervals of representable numbers.

Philosophical objections

Computer-assisted proofs are the subject of some controversy in the mathematical world, with Thomas Tymoczko first to articulate objections. Those who adhere to Tymoczko's arguments believe that lengthy computer-assisted proofs are not, in some sense, 'real' mathematical proofs because they involve so many logical steps that they are not practically verifiable by human beings, and that mathematicians are effectively being asked to replace logical deduction from assumed axioms with trust in an empirical computational process, which is potentially affected by errors in the computer program, as well as defects in the runtime environment and hardware.

Other mathematicians believe that lengthy computer-assisted proofs should be regarded as calculations, rather than proofs: the proof algorithm itself should be proved valid, so that its use can then be regarded as a mere "verification".  Arguments that computer-assisted proofs are subject to errors in their source programs, compilers, and hardware can be resolved by providing a formal proof of correctness for the computer program (an approach which was successfully applied to the four-color theorem in 2005) as well as replicating the result using different programming languages, different compilers, and different computer hardware.

Another possible way of verifying computer-aided proofs is to generate their reasoning steps in a machine-readable form, and then use a proof checker program to demonstrate their correctness. Since validating a given proof is much easier than finding a proof, the checker program is simpler than the original assistant program, and it is correspondingly easier to gain confidence into its correctness. However, this approach of using a computer program to prove the output of another program correct does not appeal to computer proof skeptics, who see it as adding another layer of complexity without addressing the perceived need for human understanding.

Another argument against computer-aided proofs is that they lack mathematical elegance—that they provide no insights or new and useful concepts.  In fact, this is an argument that could be advanced against any lengthy proof by exhaustion.

An additional philosophical issue raised by computer-aided proofs is whether they make mathematics into a quasi-empirical science, where the scientific method becomes more important than the application of pure reason in the area of abstract mathematical concepts. This directly relates to the argument within mathematics as to whether mathematics is based on ideas, or "merely" an exercise in formal symbol manipulation. It also raises the question whether, if according to the Platonist view, all possible mathematical objects in some sense "already exist", whether computer-aided mathematics is an observational science like astronomy, rather than an experimental one like physics or chemistry. This controversy within mathematics is occurring at the same time as questions are being asked in the physics community about whether twenty-first century theoretical physics is becoming too mathematical, and leaving behind its experimental roots.

The emerging field of experimental mathematics is confronting this debate head-on by focusing on numerical experiments as its main tool for mathematical exploration.

Applications

Theorems proved with the help of computer programs
Inclusion in this list does not imply that a formal computer-checked proof exists, but rather, that a computer program has been involved in some way. See the main articles for details.

Theorems for sale
In 2010, academics at The University of Edinburgh offered people the chance to "buy their own theorem" created through a computer-assisted proof. This new theorem would be named after the purchaser. This service now appears to no longer be available.

See also

References

Further reading

External links

 

Argument technology
Automated theorem proving
Computer-assisted proofs
Formal methods
Numerical analysis
Philosophy of mathematics